Jacqueline 'Jacqui' McShee (born 25 December 1943) is an English singer. Since 1966 she has performed with Pentangle, a jazz-influenced folk rock band.

Biography
McShee was born in Catford, South London.  Her musical career began as a soloist in British folk clubs in the mid 1960s. After working with guitarist John Renbourn, she co-founded Pentangle.

Pentangle rapidly established itself as one of the earliest exponents of the British folk rock movement. However, in addition to attracting fans of traditional British folk, they also drew audiences from the rock, pop and psychedelic folk worlds. The original band played a mixture of ballads, blues, and jazz, often blending these genres in the same piece.

In 1994, McShee formed a new band named Jacqui McShee's Pentangle which, with a few personnel changes, is still performing today.

In 1995, McShee performed as a session singer, along with her husband, drummer Gerry Conway, on the album Active in The Parish by the singer-songwriter David Hughes. It was voted Q magazine's 'Album of the Year'. In 1998, McShee teamed up with Ulrich Maske to record The Frog and the Mouse and The Cat and the Fiddle. These two books were designed to help German children to learn to speak English.

In 2020, she and British guitarist Kevin Dempsey released From There to Here (MCDEM 001), a recording of self-composed songs and traditional tunes. In November 2020, she was reported to be living in Surrey, England.

McShee has a sister. Both of them joined the Campaign for Nuclear Disarmament in the early 1960s.

Discography 
As a collective 
 Jacqui McShee, Danny Thompson, Tony Roberts, Vic Abram, An Album of English Christmas Carols (1994)

As a session musician (session singer)
 John Renbourn, Another Monday (1966)
 David Hughes, Active in The Parish (1995) (along with drummer Gerry Conway)

Collaborations with Ulrich Maske 
 The Frog and the Mouse (1998) (audio book)
 The Cat and the Fiddle (1998) (audio book)

Collaboration with British guitarist Kevin Dempsey 
 From There to Here (2020)

References

External links

Jacqui McShee's official website
Official Jacqui McShee's Pentangle website

1943 births
Living people
People from Catford
English folk singers
English women singers
British folk rock musicians
English people of Irish descent
Musicians from Kent
Pentangle (band) members